Adrien Léopold Marie Guyon (22 July 1866 – 21 May 1926) was a French fencer. He competed in the individual foil and épée events at the 1900 Summer Olympics.

References

External links
 

1866 births
1926 deaths
French male épée fencers
French male foil fencers
Olympic fencers of France
Fencers at the 1900 Summer Olympics
Fencers from Paris